Pietro Sforzin (born 6 December 1919 in Ceggia; died 18 February 1986 in Padua) was an Italian professional football player.

See also
Football in Italy
List of football clubs in Italy

References

1919 births
1986 deaths
Italian footballers
Serie A players
Calcio Padova players
Juventus F.C. players
Hellas Verona F.C. players
Association football defenders